Lay That Rifle Down is a 1955 American comedy film directed by Charles Lamont starring Judy Canova. It was the thirteenth and last in a series of Judy Canova films released by Republic Pictures.

Plot
Judy Canova works in a hotel for her domineering aunt. Her unscrupulous relatives try to blackmail and dupe her into selling her apparently worthless farm, having been led to believe that it has enormous potential value by a couple of confidence tricksters.

Main cast
 Judy Canova as Judy Canova 
 Robert Lowery as Nick Stokes, aka Poindexter March, III 
 Jil Jarmyn as Betty Greeb 
 Jacqueline deWit as Aunt Sarah Greeb 
 Richard Deacon as Glover Speckleton 
 Robert Burton as General Ballard 
 James Bell as Mr. Fetcher 
 Leon Tyler as Horace Speckleton 
 Tweeny Canova as Tweeny Greeb

See also
List of American films of 1955

References

Bibliography
 Hurst, Richard M. Republic Studios: Beyond Poverty Row and the Majors. Scarecrow Press, 2007.

External links

1955 films
American comedy films
1955 comedy films
Films directed by Charles Lamont
American black-and-white films
Republic Pictures films
1950s English-language films
1950s American films